The Addington Foursomes was a golf tournament played in Addington Golf Club near Croydon, South London from 1933 to 1939. Each pair consisted of a professional and amateur. The first tournament was held from 31 October to 2 November 1933 but thereafter the event was held in April.

Winners

References

Golf tournaments in England